Cağazur or Dzhagazur or Dzhagadzur or Dzhagazyr may refer to:
Cağazur, Lachin, Azerbaijan
Cağazur, Nakhchivan, Azerbaijan